Marta Bertoncelli  (born 3 July 2001) is an Italian slalom canoeist who has competed at the international level since 2016. She competed at the 2020 Summer Olympics.

Career 
Marta finished 3rd in the C1 event at the 2017 Junior World Championships in Bratislava and 2nd in the same event in 2018 on her home course in Ivrea. At the 2019 Junior World Championships she won a gold medal in the C1 team event and a bronze medal in the C1 event. Bertoncelli achieved her best World Championship result of 15th in the C1 event in 2019.

In May 2021 with her place at the delayed 2020 Tokyo Olympics secured following her performance at the 2019 World Championships in La Seu d'Urgell, she was honoured by Stefano Bonaccini, the president of the Emilia-Romagna region for her achievements. She competed in the debut appearance of the women's C1 event, after it was introduced for the 2020 games. She finished in 15th place in Tokyo after being eliminated in the semifinal.

Personal life
Her father Luca is the president of the Ferrara canoe club. She plays the ukulele in her free time.

References

External links

Living people
2001 births
Italian female canoeists
Olympic canoeists of Italy
Canoeists at the 2020 Summer Olympics